The shrew-toothed shrew tenrec (Microgale soricoides) is a species of mammal in the family Tenrecidae. It is endemic to Madagascar. Its natural habitat is subtropical or tropical moist forests.

References

Afrosoricida
Mammals of Madagascar
Mammals described in 1993
Taxonomy articles created by Polbot